Stanley John Gethin (16 February 1875 – 17 February 1950) was an English first-class cricketer who played in four matches for Worcestershire. His highest score of 41 was against London County, while his only first-class wicket, that of future Test player Len Braund, came in the same match.

Gethin was born in Kidderminster, Worcestershire and also died there one day after his 75th birthday.

Gethin's younger brother William played one match for Worcestershire in 1921.

External links
 

1875 births
1950 deaths
Sportspeople from Kidderminster
English cricketers
Worcestershire cricketers